Richard Hall (April 30, 1855 – March 29, 1918) was an American-born insurance agent, wholesale coal merchant and political figure in British Columbia. He represented Victoria City in the Legislative Assembly of British Columbia from 1898 to 1907 as a Liberal.

He was born in San Francisco, the son of Richard Hall and Sarah Dunderdale, who were both natives of Lancashire, England. Hall was educated in Victoria, British Columbia. For a time, he worked in the dry goods trade and then as a purser on a steamboat. Hall entered the wholesale coal trade in 1882. He was also president of the Victoria Sealing Company. In 1887, Hall married Louisa Kinsman. He was defeated when he ran for reelection to the assembly in 1907. Hall died in Victoria.

References 

1855 births
1918 deaths
British Columbia Liberal Party MLAs
Politicians from San Francisco
American emigrants to Canada
Politicians from Victoria, British Columbia